The 33rd César Awards ceremony was presented by the Académie des Arts et Techniques du Cinéma to honour the best films of 2007 in France. It was held on 22 February 2008 at the Théâtre du Châtelet in Paris. The ceremony was chaired by Jean Rochefort and hosted by Antoine de Caunes. The Secret of the Grain won the award for Best Film.

Winners and nominees
The nominees were announced on 25 January 2008.

Viewers
The show was followed by 2.4 million viewers. This corresponds to 11.9% of the audience.

See also
 80th Academy Awards
 61st British Academy Film Awards
 20th European Film Awards
 13th Lumières Awards

References

External links

 Official website
 
 33rd César Awards at AlloCiné

2008
2008 film awards
2008 in French cinema
2008 in Paris
February 2008 events in France